One X One is an album by the Japanese R&B duo Chemistry, released on February 18, 2004, by Sony Music Japan.

Track listing
 "Intro-lude"
 "Us"
 "YOUR NAME NEVER GONE"
 "my Rivets"
 "This age"
 "Bound for Identity～dear friend～"
 "～Street Sounds of Naples,Italy～"
 "meaning of tears"
 "Ordinary hero"
 "Now or Never"
 "So in Vain"
 "赤い雲 白い星"
 "~Interlude~"
 "アシタヘカエル"
 "いとしい人"

External links
 Official Site: Track downloads

Chemistry (band) albums
2004 albums